The 2002 Asian Women's Handball Championship, the ninth Asian Championship, which was taking place from 26 to 31 July 2002 in Almaty, Kazakhstan. It acted as the Asian qualifying tournament for the 2003 World Women's Handball Championship.

Draw

* Withdrew

Preliminary round
All times are local (UTC+6).

Group A

Group B

Placement 5th/6th

Final round

Semifinals

Bronze medal match

Gold medal match

Final standing

Kazakhstan withdrew and was replaced by Japan in the 2003 World Championship.

External links
Women Handball Asia 2002 Almaty (KAZ) 25.07-01.08 Winner Kazakhstan, todor66

Asian
Handball
International handball competitions hosted by Kazakhstan
Asian Handball Championships
July 2002 sports events in Asia